The 1996 Nokia Cup, southern Ontario men's provincial curling championship was held February 6-11 at the Pickering Recreation Complex in Pickering, Ontario. The winning rink of Bob Ingram, Larry Smyth, Robert Rumfeldt, Jim Brackett from the Ridgetown Curling Club would go on to represent Ontario at the 1996 Labatt Brier in Kamloops, British Columbia.  

Ingram won his lone provincial championship, defeating future Olympic gold medallist Russ Howard in the final. Ingram scored a big four-ender in the first thanks to a Howard miss, and Howard missed a double attempt in the last end which gave the win to Ingram.

Standings
Final standings

Scores

February 6
Draw 1
Spencer 7, Minogue 6 
Werenich 10, Ingram 5
Roberson 8, Park 0 
Tosh 8, Walker 6
Shinn 8, Howard 5

Draw 2 
Werenich 10, Shinn 4 
Minogue 9, Park 3 
Walker 7, Spencer 4 
Howard 10, Ingram 8 
Tosh 8, Robertson 5

February 7
Draw 3
Ingram 9, Robertson 4 
Howard 9, Walker 7
Minogue 6, Tosh 4 
Park 7, Shinn 5 
Spencer 9, Werenich 8

Draw 4
Minogue 9, Walker 4 
Werenich 9, Robertson 6
Ingram 9, Shinn 2 
Tosh 7, Spencer 2 
Howard 5, Park 4

February 8
Draw 5
Tosh 8, Shinn 4 
Spencer 8, Park 4 
Howard 10, Werenich 8
Minogue 6, Ingram 5 
Robertson 8, Walker 5

Draw 6 
Howard 9, Tosh 6 
Spencer 7, Robertson 6 
Ingram 11, Walker 3 
Werenich 9, Park 2 
Minogue 9, Shinn 4

February 9
Draw 7 
Tosh 8, Park 7
Werenich 10, Walker 4 
Howard 10, Minogue 2 
Shinn 10, Robertson 8
Ingram 8, Spencer 1 

Draw 8
Werenich 10, Tosh 3 
Ingram 6, Park 3 
Walker 9, Shinn 8
Robertson 8, Minogue 4 
Howard 9, Spencer 3

February 10
Draw 9
Robertson 7, Howard 5
Ingram 12, Tosh 3
Spencer 11, Shinn 5
Werenich 7, Minogue 2 
Walker 10, Park 6

Playoffs

Semifinal
February 10, 1996

Final
February 11, 1996

References

Ontario Nokia Cup
Ontario Tankard
Pickering, Ontario
Nokia Cup
Ontario Nokia Cup